Susumu Yamaguchi (25 January 1897 – 25 November 1983) was a Japanese painter. His work was part of the painting event in the art competition at the 1932 Summer Olympics.

References

1897 births
1983 deaths
20th-century Japanese painters
Japanese painters
Olympic competitors in art competitions
People from Nagano Prefecture